Xingye Alloy Materials Group Limited was formerly known as Huan Yue Interactive Holdings Limited, and Xingye Copper International Group Limited, one of the leading high precision copper producer in China. It mainly involves in producing high precision copper plates and strips, tin phosphorus bronze plates and strips, brass plates and strips, lead frame strips and nickel silver plates and strips. Its products are sold under the "Three Rings" brand, which has been awarded recognition as a "China Top Brand". It is established in 1998 and headquartered in Cixi, Ningbo, Zhejiang province, China.

It was listed on the Hong Kong Stock Exchange in 2007 with the price of HK$1.7 per share.

Its board approved the name change of the company in Sep 2016 from Xingye Copper International Group Limited to Huan Yue Interactive Holdings Limited.

In June 2020, the board has further approved the company name change to Xingye Alloy Materials Group Limited.

Recent Developments 
In 2016, Xingye Copper acquired Internet and Mobile Gaming products development company Funnytime Limited and its subsidiaries for roughly HK$186 million. Subsequently, in order to better reflect its activities in various industries and sectors, the company considered changing its English name from "Xingye Copper International Group Limited" to "Huan Yue Interactive Holdings Limited" and its name in Chinese from "興業銅業國際集團有限公司" to "歡悅互娛控股有限公司".

In June 2020, the company name was changed to Xingye Alloy Materials Group Limited, and with its chinese name from "歡悅互娛控股有限公司" to "興業合金材料集團有限公司".

References

External links
Xingye Copper International Group Limited

Companies listed on the Hong Kong Stock Exchange
Privately held companies of China
Chinese companies established in 1998
Companies based in Ningbo
Metal companies of China
Manufacturing companies established in 1998
1998 establishments in China